Interactive customer evaluation (ICE) is commonly implemented in web-based applications. Its purpose is to provide feedback. The term does not refer to a commercial application.

The interactive customer evaluation (ICE) system is a web-based tool that collects feedback on web applications, computer software, or other services provided by a company or organization. The ICE system allows customers to submit online comment cards to rate the service providers they have encountered. It is designed to improve customer service by allowing managers to monitor the satisfaction levels of services provided through reports and customer comments. ICE provides the following benefits:
 Allows customers to quickly and easily provide feedback to service provider managers.
 Gives leadership timely data on service quality.
 Allows managers to benchmark the performance of their service providers against other organizations.
 Encourages communication across organizations by comparing best practices to increase performance results.
 Saves money

Typical ICE
A typical example is a feedback form or comments form, which provides a text area for a user to submit his or her recommendations for improving the service.

Advanced ICE
Advanced ICE implementations may include rating systems for various aspects of the service.
The case for an advanced ICE implementation:

The managers want to know exactly what to fix in the application, to keep the customers happy. The customers however, will have limited time and energy to put into reporting the shortcomings. By providing a rating system (usually on a numeric scale of 1 to X, where X is 5 or 10), general satisfaction can be conveyed. By providing a text area in addition to the rating system, a user can express specific shortcomings.

ICE response
It is typical to acknowledge the user's ICE submission immediately after the submission. This is usually in the form of a web page, if the ICE used a web page.
In addition, if the user's identity is known, an automated email response is customary.

In all responses, users are generally thanked for their time and for helping to make the service better. In addition, some services may wish to promise some level of follow-up.

Web design